Kadriye Şanıvar Olgun (born 1954), Turkish diplomat and ambassador.

Private life
Kadriye Şanıvar Olgun was born in Yozgat, Turkey in 1954. After completing her high school education at TED Ankara College Foundation Schools, she graduated from the Faculty of Political Science, Ankara University. She was married to diplomat and ambassador Balkan Kızıldeli.

Career
In 1977, she entered the service of the Ministry of Foreign Affairs. Before she was appointed Ambassador of Turkey to Lithuania, she was the Deputy Director General of the Department for NATO  Affairs in the Ministry.

She served as Ambassador of Turkey to Lithuania between 1 February 2004 and 31 December 2006, to Cuba from 14 February 2007 to 2 October 2009, to Norway between 16 December 2012 and 1 March 2014, and to Panama from 4 March 2014 to 15 November 2016.

Olgun served as the Director General of the Department for Balkans and Central Europe Affairs in 2010, and as the Chief of Protocol one year long in 2010-2011 before she took office in Oslo as ambassador.

References

Living people
1954 births
People from Yozgat
TED Ankara College Foundation Schools alumni
Ankara University Faculty of Political Sciences alumni
Turkish women ambassadors
Ambassadors of Turkey to Lithuania
Ambassadors of Turkey to Cuba
Ambassadors of Turkey to Norway
Ambassadors of Turkey to Panama
21st-century Turkish diplomats